Scotinotylus allocotus is a species of sheet weaver found in the United States. It was described by Crawford & Edwards in 1989.

References

Linyphiidae
Spiders of the United States
Spiders described in 1989